Masashi Otani may refer to:
 Masashi Otani (footballer, born 1983) (大谷 昌司), Japanese footballer
 Masashi Otani (footballer, born 1994) (大谷 真史), Japanese footballer